Starfall is a role-playing adventure published by West End Games in 1989 for Star Wars: The Roleplaying Game, which itself is based on Star Wars.

Plot summary
In Starfall, the players take on the roles of Rebels who have been imprisoned on a Star Destroyer. They are given the opportunity to escape when the ship is damaged in an attack, but must also take with them and safeguard an important Rebel, Walex Bissel.

Publication history
Starfall was written by Rob Jenkins and Michael Stern, and was published by West End Games in 1989 as an 40-page booklet that also included a large color map of the Star Destroyer, and two cardboard counter sheets. It was later reprinted with Strike Force: Shantipole and The Game Chambers of Questal in Classic Adventures Vol 5 for the 2nd Revised and Expanded edition in 1998.

Reception
In the March 1990 edition of Dragon (Issue #155), Jim Bambra complimented "the copious background information provided in the text [that] makes it easy for the GM to run this adventure even when the Rebels head off in totally unexpected directions." Bambra also noted that "Much of this information is reusable, further adding to the usefulness of this adventure." He concluded with a strong recommendation, commenting, "It does an excellent job of turning scenes from the movies into a good slice of adventure gaming."

Other recognition
A copy of Starfall is held in the collection of the Strong National Museum of Play (object 110.2604).

Other reviews
White Wolf #15 (April/May, 1989)

References

Role-playing game supplements introduced in 1989
Star Wars: The Roleplaying Game adventures